Stanley Lynn Fanning (November 22, 1937 – November 21, 1995) was an American football tackle, defensive end, and defensive tackle. He played for the Chicago Bears from 1960 to 1962, the Los Angeles Rams in 1963 and for the Denver Broncos and Houston Oilers in 1964.

Fanning went to high school in Pullman, Washington, and played college football at nearby Idaho. He was selected by the Bears in the eleventh round of the 1960 NFL Draft, 128th overall.

References

External links

ErinFanning.com – Celebrating Fathers 4: The Biggest Bear
From Chicken Farmer to the Chicago Bears – by Erin Fanning (daughter) 

1937 births
1995 deaths
American football tackles
American football defensive ends
American football defensive tackles
Idaho Vandals football players
Chicago Bears players
Los Angeles Rams players
Denver Broncos players
Houston Oilers players